The S1 is a commuter rail route forming part of the Milan suburban railway service, which converges on the city of Milan, Italy.

The service operates over the Milan–Saronno, Milan Passante, and Milan–Bologna lines. Like all other Milan suburban railway service routes, it is operated by Trenord.

Route 

S1, a cross-city route, heads in a southeasterly direction from Saronno to Milano Lancetti.  From there, it runs via the Milan Passante railway through the municipality of Milan to Milano Rogoredo, and finally to Lodi. The travel takes 1h29'.

History
The S1 was activated on 12 December 2004, and operated initially between Saronno and Milano Porta Vittoria.

With the change of timetable on 15 June 2008, the service was extended from Milano Porta Vittoria to Milano Rogoredo, where there is interchange with regional trains and long-distance services to and from Genoa, Bologna and Mantua.

To coincide with another timetable change on 13 December 2009, the service was further extended, from Rogoredo to Lodi, during the day between rush hours.  From 13 June 2010, all other Monday to Friday services were extended to Lodi.

Stations 
The stations on the S1 are as follows (stations with blue background are in the municipality of Milan):

Scheduling 
, S1 trains ran half-hourly between 06:00 and 21:00 Monday to Friday.

See also 

 History of rail transport in Italy
 List of Milan suburban railway stations
 Rail transport in Italy
 Transport in Milan

References

External links

 ATM  – official site 
 Trenord – official site  English, French, German and Spanish
 Schematic of Line S1 – schematic depicting all stations on Line S1

This article is based upon a translation of the Italian language version as at November 2012.

Milan S Lines